Lost in Translation may refer to:

Film and television
 Lost in Translation (film), a 2003 film directed by Sofia Coppola
 Trevor Noah: Lost in Translation, a 2015 stand-up comedy special by Trevor Noah
 "...In Translation", a 2005 episode of the TV series Lost
 "Lost in Translation", a 2006 episode 49 of the TV series The Suite Life of Zack and Cody
 "Lost in Translation" (Robin Hood), a 2009 episode of the 2006 TV series, Robin Hood

Literature
 "Lost in Translation" (poem), a 1974 poem by James Merrill
 Lost in Translation (memoir), a 1989 memoir by Eva Hoffman 
 Lost in Translation (novel), a 1999 novel by Nicole Mones
 Lost in Translation (webtoon), a webtoon by Jjolee

Music
 Lost in Translation (soundtrack) by Kevin Shields
 Lost in Translation (mixtape), a 2011 mixtape by Mr. Muthafuckin' eXquire
 Lost in Translation (New Politics album)
 Lost in Translation, a 1995 album by Roger Eno
 Lost in Translation, an album by Ellwood
 "Lost in Translation", a song by Apoptygma Berzerk on the 2005 album You and Me Against the World
 "Lost in Translation", a song by Frontline from the 2005 album Borrowed Time
 "Lost in Translation", a song by Of Machines on the 2009 album As If Everything Was Held in Place
 "Lost in Translation", a song by Logic from Confessions of a Dangerous Mind
 "Lost in Translation", a song by Reks from Straight, No Chaser

See also
Untranslatability
"Lost and Found in Translation", a 2004 episode of the TV series Power Rangers: Dino Thunder
 "Lust in Translation", a 2007 episode of The Green Green Grass
 Lost in the Translation, a 1994 album by Axiom Ambient
 Lost in the Translation, an album by Jeff Scott Soto